Scientologie, Wissenschaft von der Beschaffenheit und der Tauglichkeit des Wissens (Scientology: Science of the Constitution and Usefulness of Knowledge) is a 1934 book published by Anastasius Nordenholz, in which he defines the term "Scientologie" or "Eidologie" as a science of knowing or knowledge and discusses the philosophical implications of the concept.

The book has been cited by some as a possible source of inspiration for L. Ron Hubbard and his better-known conception of Scientology, though this interpretation is disputed.

Summary of the book

Nordenholz highlights the problem of isolating knowledge as "a particular appearance of the world." He asks:

"What is Knowing? What IS Knowledge? What can we know, what must we know about Knowledge/Knowing, to do justice to and to justify the world? The question is thus nothing less than self-knowing, determination of the nature of self, and also of self-realization and self-understanding of Knowledge/Knowing. Is this possible? If possible, how can the systemization of Knowledge/Knowing itself be accomplished? How can a Science of Knowledge/Knowing be produced?"

After establishing a number of definitions, he concludes that

"the world is nothing but knowledge, merely an extraction from knowing....Only out of the equally valued mutual operation of Knowledge/Knowing as shaper & creator, and world as created & shaped, is it possible to arrive at the true science of the world....Out of this circumstance comes the right of Scientologie to treat the world as belonging to its counterpart, as an appendage of the consciousness."

He goes on to assert that human consciousness can be raised to a position of independence, or isolation, but notes that "The consciousness, which always remains a part and particular creation of the world, is incompetent to create from a nothingness because of this very worldliness. In order for the consciousness to be able to create, it has to first find a fountainhead source out of which it can create, and this Something is a Beingness."

Nordenholz next introduces the concept of a number of axioms and systems which "stand of their
own power and dignity, as if they were capable of, but do not need, a verification or confirmation from another source." He defines the structure of Scientologie:

1. In axioms: exposition of the axioms and the axiom systems of consciousness.
2. In systems: erection of the forming or moulding system of the consciousnesses, the comprehension system of the reason, all form the axiom system.
3. In demonstration: justification of the produced comprehension systems and with that, working back to the underlying basis of the axiom systems.
4. In study of the origin, nature, methods, and limits of knowledge: establishment of the Total-system of sciences from the foundation of Scientologie systems of knowledge and comprehension.

Nordenholz held that the most important axiom was the Axiom of Mediation:

"The consciousness, nominated as the creator of the world, presupposes a wellspring, a source, out of which it can scoop; a Being, which somehow and in some measure can be reached thru consciousness, but which exists there by itself BEFORE and independent from the consciousness. The assumption of a creator activity of the consciousness is dependent upon the Standing Orders of self-primordial, free, detached, absolute Beings, the By-Itself-Being(s)."

Relationship with Scientology

George Malko claims that Nordenholz's concept of Scientologie has no proven connection to Scientology, which was created later by L. Ron Hubbard, although he notes some possible similarities between the ideas expounded by Nordenholz and Hubbard. Roy Wallis casts doubt on the perceived similarities, noting that Malko had used an English translation produced in 1968 by a former Scientologist, Woodward R. McPheeters. Wallis comments: 
"McPheeters was a Scientologist of many years standing who left the movement for a schismatic offshoot, and in an atmosphere of mutual hostility. It is at least a possibility that this may have influenced the translation. An independent translation which I commissioned, of some pages from the original, seems to bear this out. The possible parallels with Hubbardian formulations are very much less evident."

He also notes that there is no evidence that Hubbard could read German.

Furthermore, the Free Zone association of independent scientologists (Freie Zone e.V.) considers the parallels in content sufficiently valid to republish it "in its original context".

The term "Scientologie" is a registered trademark of the Religious Technology Center, which controls the Church of Scientology's trademarks. It is used in French-speaking countries as a localized version of the word "Scientology", though in Germany the church uses "Scientology" instead.

The Church is currently in dispute with Free Zone Scientologists who have schismed off into their own offshoot of Scientology. They use the domain name scientologie.de for their website; the Church has attempted to force the Free Zoners to relinquish this domain name, claiming trademark infringement. But the German courts have rejected this in the light of Nordenholz having coined the term long before the church registered it as a trademark; also refusing the argument of "possible confusion" because Free Zone per se does not sell courses nor indeed anything else; and that the use of a similar name in these circumstances was covered by the "fair use" policy.

The English-language term "Scientology" originated neither with Hubbard nor Nordenholz, but with philologist Allen Upward, who coined the term in 1907 in his book The New Word.  
This reference is cited to be a use of the word to ridicule pseudoscientific theories in the book A Piece of Blue Sky by Jon Atack.

"...unhappily scientology is as often mistaken for science as theology is for worship."

References

External links
Did L.Ron Hubbard plagarize (sic) Scientology? (The More You Know). The original 1934 translation by McPheeters, some scanned pages.
Table of Contents and first two chapters (The Problem and Axiomatics)
Scientologie.de

Free Zone (Scientology)
Scientology-related controversies
1934 non-fiction books
Philosophy books
Science books